René Kotrík (born 14 March 1996) is a former Slovak football, who played sa a midfielder, who currently played his entire professional for FC Nitra. He was forced to retire in 2018, due to medical problems.

FC Nitra
He made his professional debut for FC Nitra against FK DAC 1904 Dunajská Streda on 31 August 2013.

External links
FC Nitra profile

Eurofotbal profile

References

1996 births
Living people
Slovak footballers
Association football midfielders
FC Nitra players
Slovak Super Liga players
Sportspeople from Bojnice